Mbei Simon Pasteur  (born 20 February 1988) is a Cameroonian professional football midfielder who currently plays for KBSC in the Ness Hungary NB II.

Club career
Prior to joining Liberia, Pasteur played for Union Douala and Impôts FC in the Cameroon Premiere Division. He scored his first professional goal for Union Douala in a league match against Tonnerre Yaoundé on 30 June 2005. Pasteur participated in the CAF Confederation Cup 2005 with Union Douala, as they lost in the third round to Enugu Rangers.

Pasteur became the first player from Cameroon to appear in the Costa Rican Primera División after Liberia Mia manager Alain Gay-Hardy signed him in 2008.

References

External links

1985 births
Living people
Cameroonian footballers
Cameroonian expatriate footballers
Expatriate footballers in Costa Rica
Association football midfielders
Bőcs KSC footballers
Kazincbarcikai SC footballers